State Central Library may refer to:
 Goa State Central Library, India
 State Central Library, Hyderabad, India
 State Central Library, Kerala, India